The Empresa Municipal de Transportes de Madrid (also known as EMT Madrid) is the company charged with the planning of public urban transport in the city in Madrid, Spain. The organization is wholly owned by the City Council of Madrid and is a member of the Consorcio Regional de Transportes de Madrid. Among the services provided by EMT Madrid are urban bus transportation as well as the BiciMAD bicycle-sharing system.

History 
EMT Madrid was established on 12 November 1947 after the dissolution of the Joint Transport Company. Originally a municipal private company, in 1971 it became a joint stock company. It provided trolleybus service until it disappeared in 1966 and tram services until 1972.

The current colour of the buses is blue and white. When the company was created in 1947, the buses were also blue, but in a darker shade than the current one, a legacy of the old Sociedad Madrileña de Tranvías. In 1974, taking advantage of the end of the trams two years earlier, the colour was gradually changed to red, culminating in 1986, the year in which all municipal buses were red. And so it was until 1992, when the first sky blue bus arrived, when Gas Natural buses began to enter the company, and these had their characteristic colour to define them from the rest. In the summer of 2008, the change of colour to the current blue began again, with the arrival of new buses and the disappearance of the old ones, with their red colour.

The company has also gone through several different logos. It began with a round E inside which were placed an M and a T. And at the end of the 1970s, two red arrows (or yellow arrows on a red background) crossed together to indicate "Ven y Voy" (Come and I'm coming). In 2010 a blue logo appeared, just like the change of colour that was taking place on the buses, with the words EMT above a square with the city's coat of arms and the word "Madrid!". In 2018, with the entire fleet of buses already in blue, the logo was changed again - for the current one - which is a lowercase "e" followed by a white ">" sign on a blue background.

Multimodal public transport

City bus lines 
The EMT manages a fleet of 2,076 buses distributed in 213 lines that have an extension of 3,500 kilometers. Currently, it provides the bus service in regular and temporary lines to replace other transports that have suffered an accident or have their service interrupted due to works.

As part of EMT's added value there is an open data system for the "Smart City", CCTV and free WiFi connection both in the most relevant stops and in the whole bus fleet.

To reduce the volume of polluting gases emitted by its vehicles through the use of alternative energies such as Compressed Natural Gas, biodiesel, electric traction, hydrogen, bioethanol; intensive renewal of the fleet with conventional diesel buses with strict environmental requirements.

The buses in Madrid are the only public transport system available around the clock as the metro network closes down between 02:00 and 06:00 am. The night buses, also known as "Buhos" (Owls), operate from 23.45 to 06.00 am. The heavy traffic in Madrid can in some cases make the city buses a fairly slow form of transportation but the city of Madrid has more than 90 km of special bus and taxi lines to help solve this issue. Buses serving the outer areas are run by 33 private companies, coordinated by the Consorcio Regional de Transportes de Madrid. This network is fundamentally radial.

BiciMAD 
In May 2016, with the municipalization of the bicycle rental service (until then operated by Bonopark S.L.) by the City Council, the EMT assumed the management of this service.

See also 

 Metro de Madrid
 Cercanías Madrid
 Transport in Madrid

References

External links 
 Official site

Transport in Madrid 
Government of Madrid
Companies based in Madrid
Transport companies established in 1947
Spanish companies established in 1947